The 1992 Cotton Bowl Classic featured the Florida State Seminoles and the Texas A&M Aggies.

Background
The Aggies were the Southwest Conference champions for the first time since 1987, and they had done it with a perfect 8-0 record in conference. A Tulsa loss early in the season was their only one in the regular season as they bounced back to play in the Cotton Bowl for the first time since 1988. The Seminoles were the preseason #1 team, and they had stayed #1 until their loss to Miami. A loss to Florida the next week dropped them to #5, but the Seminoles looked to finish strong in their first Cotton Bowl Classic and 8th consecutive bowl season.

Game summary
Rain turned out to be the enemy for the Aggies, who could only muster a safety after Quentin Coryatt sacked Casey Weldon five minutes into the game. But the Seminoles responded eight minutes later with a Weldon touchdown run that had been set up by a fumble recovery by Clifton Abraham. The game was marred by missed opportunities and 13 turnovers, which tied a bowl record. With 2:40 to go, Gerry Thomas would seal A&M's fate with a 27-yard field goal, making the final score 10-2. This was the first Cotton Bowl Classic to have a team's only score be a safety since the 1981 Cotton Bowl Classic. Sean Jackson rushed for 119 yards on 27 carries for the Seminoles and Chris Crooms had two interceptions for A&M, and both were named MVP.

Aftermath
The Seminoles would move to the Atlantic Coast Conference and was in position for another shot at the championship before another loss to Miami knocked them out of contention. 
A&M would go to three more Cotton Bowls before the decade ended but lose all three.

Statistics

References

Cotton Bowl Classic
Cotton Bowl Classic
Florida State Seminoles football bowl games
Texas A&M Aggies football bowl games
January 1992 sports events in the United States
1992 in sports in Texas
1990s in Dallas
1992 in Texas